The titan worm snake (Typhlops titanops) is a species of snake in the Typhlopidae family.

Distribution
This species is endemic to Hispaniola, where it occurs on the Massif de la Selle (Haiti) and Sierra de Bahoruco (Dominican Republic).

Conservation
This species is known from very few records. S.B. Hedges (pers. comm. 2017) has only found two individuals in 30 years of surveying, both taken in June 1985 at  along the Rio Molito, on the Dominican side of the border. Extremely high rates of forest clearance at elevations where this snake occurs, and its likely reliance on deadwood, leaf litter or forest soils suggests that the population is likely to be severely fragmented.

References

Typhlops
Reptiles described in 1989
Endemic fauna of Hispaniola
Reptiles of the Dominican Republic
Reptiles of Haiti